Wettererkundungsstaffeln (also known as Wekusta or Westa) were flying units of the Luftwaffe of squadron strength used for weather reconnaissance. Their primary task was to collect weather data in areas that only aircraft could penetrate.

For the planning and conduct of military operations, the ability to produce accurate weather forecasts can be a decisive factor. However, international weather data required for this purpose were not readily available to the German military at the time of the Second World War. The Wehrmacht therefore created a global network of weather stations, weather ships and weather aircraft. The weather aircraft were organised into special squadrons and were usually directly subordinate to the Luftwaffe or Luftwaffenführungskommando. Overall, there were eleven Wekustas, each of which had between three and twelve two-engined aircraft. Many meteorologists were conscripted into the squadrons to collect the weather data and more than 200 of them were killed.

Units 

 Notes:The squadron identification code painted on the side of the aircraft was based on the standardized Geschwaderkennung four-place alphanumeric characters used by the Luftwaffes combat wing and group-sized units, two characters on either side of the Balkenkreuz  national insignia. For example, from the table above, B7 + _A =  where _ is replaced by the identification letter of the individual aircraft Ob.d.L. = Oberbefehlshaber der Luftwaffe [Commander-in-chief of the Luftwaffe] Lfl.= Luftflotte

Notable personnel 
 Hans Bonath (1919–2004, Knight's Cross recipient)
 Erich Etienne (1915–1942, geophysicist)
 Hans Heinrich Euler (1909–1941, physicist)
 Leo Gburek (1910–1941, geophysicist)
 Martin Teich (1911–2004, a meteorologist at the German Weather Service and weatherman for German public-service television broadcaster ZDF)

References